Thiago Camilo Palmieri (born September 20, 1984 in São Paulo) is a Brazilian racing driver. Since 2003 he competes in the Stock Car Brasil touring car championship driving for Chevrolet. He was Runner-up in 2009 and 2013. He is a three-time winner of the Corrida do Milhão.

Career

Thiago Camilo began attending racetracks in the womb, Mari. His father, Jose 'Bel' Camillo, was a pilot in various categories of tourism and ended his career in Stock V8, the year his son was making his debut (2003).

Thiago belongs to a small group of Brazilian pilots that never became interested in motor racing formula, and planned a career in tourism. In 1994, began collecting good results in disputes over the Junior category São Paulo kart. Won several regional titles in 2000. joined Stock Car Light in 2001 (was third in two years he attended)

In November 2004, winning the last race of the season (November 28, at Interlagos), became the youngest driver to win the Stock Car, with 20 years, two months and eight days. That season, before the age of 20, became the youngest driver to achieve a pole position (1 May, in Tarumã). After seven seasons on the team Vogel, where he won his eight wins and ten pole positions, four times in a row came to the Super Final (2006–2009) and was runner-up (2009). Thiago Camilo inaugurates a new partnership in 2011, now running under the baton of Rosinei Campos, RCM Motorsport team owner and champion of four of the last seven seasons in the Stock Car Brasil with the team Eurofarma RC.

Racing record

Career summary

Complete Stock Car Brasil results

References

External links
  
 

1984 births
Living people
Racing drivers from São Paulo
TC 2000 Championship drivers
Stock Car Brasil drivers
Brazilian racing drivers
Toyota Gazoo Racing drivers
Michelin Pilot Challenge drivers